Mohamed Abdi Hayir is a Somali politician. He is the Minister of Industry and Trade in Somalia since 4 January 2018. He was also the former Minister of Electricity and Water of Somalia, having been appointed to the position on 12 January 2015 by Prime Minister Omar Abdirashid Ali Sharmarke.

References

Government ministers of Somalia
Living people
Year of birth missing (living people)